The 2015–16 Duke Blue Devils women's basketball team represented Duke University during the 2015–16 NCAA Division I women's basketball season. Returning as head coach was Joanne P. McCallie entering her 9th season. The team played its home games at Cameron Indoor Stadium in Durham, North Carolina as members of the Atlantic Coast Conference. They finished the season 20–12, 8–8 in ACC play, to finish in a tie for seventh place. They advanced to the quarterfinals of the ACC women's tournament to Notre Dame. They missed the NCAA tournament for the first time since 1994 and they were also not invited to the Women's National Invitation Tournament for the first time in 21 years due to a limited roster.

2015–16 media
All Blue Devils games aired on the Blue Devil IMG Sports Network. WDNC once again acted as the main station for the Blue Devils IMG Sports Network games with Steve Barnes providing the play-by-play and Morgan Patrick acting as analyst.

Roster

Schedule

|-
!colspan=12 style="background:#001A57; color:#FFFFFF;"| Exhibition

|-
!colspan=12 style="background:#001A57; color:#FFFFFF;"| Non-conference regular season

|-
!colspan=12 style="background:#001A57; color:#FFFFFF;"| ACC Regular Season

|-
!colspan=12 style="background:#001A57;"| ACC Women's Tournament

Source

Rankings
2015–16 NCAA Division I women's basketball rankings

See also
 2015–16 Duke Blue Devils men's basketball team

References

Duke Blue Devils women's basketball seasons
Duke